Shorts Ditch is a  long 1st order tributary to Deep Creek in Sussex County, Delaware.  This is the only stream of this name in the United States.

Course
Shorts Ditch rises on the Gravelly Branch divide 2.5 miles southeast of Coverdale Crossroads, and then flows southwest to join Deep Creek about 0.5 miles northeast of Old Furnace.

Watershed
Shorts Ditch drains  of area, receives about 45.1 in/year of precipitation, has a wetness index of 738.93, and is about 22% forested.

See also
List of rivers of Delaware

References

Rivers of Delaware
Rivers of Sussex County, Delaware